James Roach (12 January 1864 – 1955) was an English professional footballer who made 15 appearances in the First Division of the Football League playing for Small Heath. He played as a goalkeeper.

Roach was born in West Bromwich, Staffordshire. He played football for local clubs and in the army before joining Small Heath in 1895, by which time he was over 30. He made his debut on 7 September 1895 in a 7–3 defeat at Aston Villa, and retained the starting place for a run of games which included several more heavy defeats, until relinquishing it to William Meates halfway through the season. He then went on to play for Hereford Town and Bristol Eastville Rovers.

Roach died in Birmingham in 1955 aged about 91.

References

1864 births
1955 deaths
Sportspeople from West Bromwich
English footballers
Association football goalkeepers
Hereford Thistle F.C. players
Birmingham City F.C. players
Hereford Town F.C. players
Bristol Rovers F.C. players
English Football League players
Date of death missing